The 2013 Punggol East by-election was held on 26 January 2013 with Lee Li Lian from the Worker's Party as the winning candidate. This followed the resignation of Michael Palmer from the People's Action Party on 12 December 2012.

This was the 17th by-election since the first election. The nomination day was held on 16 January 2013, with polling day was on 26 January 2013. This was also returning officer, Yam Ah Mee's last stint, following his resignation from the People's Association.

On 26 January 2013, Lee Li Lian of the Workers' Party was elected as the Member of Parliament for Punggol East SMC, marking the second by-election victory for an opposition party after the 1981 Anson by-election. It also marked the second SMC won by the Worker's Party. Moreover, this was the first time since 1961 that the opposition won two consecutive by-elections, as well as the first instance since 1965.

Background
The by-election was called by President Tony Tan Keng Yam at the advice of Prime Minister Lee Hsien Loong after the seat of Punggol East was left vacant when then the incumbent, then Speaker of Parliament Michael Palmer, resigned from his seat due to him having an extramarital affair.

A local tabloid, The New Paper, reported that they received a tip-off on 8 December 2012, in the form of screengrabs of phone messages that the Speaker of Parliament, Michael Palmer was having an extramarital affair. The messages suggested that the two had close relationship and met regularly on Mondays.  The New Paper also stated that they have been in this relationship for a year. On the same Saturday, Palmer met DPM Teo Chee Hean to tender his resignation as speaker and MP. The next day, PM Lee Hsien Loong met Palmer to confirm his resignation.

On 12 December 2012, the PAP called a press conference where Palmer announced that he resigned to "take full responsibility for a grave mistake" for having an improper relationship with a PA staff working in the Pasir Ris West constituency office, Laura Ong. Although Ong did not work under Palmer, Punggol East belonged to the Pasir Ris-Punggol division and Punggol East still works together on constituencies affairs. Deputy Prime Minister Teo Chee Hean announced at the press conference announced that Teo Ser Luck will be the interim MP for Punggol East, while Zainal Sapari would be the new chairman for the Pasir Ris-Punggol town council. Deputy Speaker Charles Chong served as the Acting Speaker until 14 January 2013 where Halimah Yacob became the new speaker.

Confirmation of by-election
On 9 January 2013, President Tony Tan Keng Yam issued a writ of election for the electoral division of Punggol East. The nominations was held on 16 January at North Vista Secondary School and voting took place on 26 January.

Candidates
On 10 January 2013, PAP unveiled their candidate to stand in the by-election, Dr Koh Poh Koon, a 40-year-old colorectal surgeon from Mount Elizabeth Medical Centre. Four days later, WP unveiled a previously-contested candidate Lee Li Lian.

In a press statement to the media on 15 January 2013, the Singapore Democratic Alliance (SDA) announced secretary-general Desmond Lim as its candidates. At a news conference outside Rivervale Plaza later on the evening, the Reform Party (RP) announce that chief Kenneth Jeyaretnam will be the fourth candidate.

The Singapore Democratic Party initially expressed interest in contesting the election, even proposing a joint campaign with the WP, but on 15 January, the SDP announced its decision not to contest the by-election and backed WP.

There were potential independent candidates who declared their intentions to run. They included former People's Liberal Democratic Party founder Ooi Boon Ewe, retired acupuncturist Zeng Guoyuan and former Singapore People's Party member Benjamin Pwee, who later pulled out of the race, citing the lack of time to run under a party banner as a reason for pulling out.

Results
Before results were announced, SDA's Desmond Lim conceded at about 10.42pm (SGT) thanking his supporters and vowed to 'keep SDA's flame alive' in the next election.

Results were announced on 10.57pm (SGT) where WP's Lee was declared candidate-elect with 54.52% out of 29,415 valid votes, beating PAP opponent Koh with 43.71% of the vote. Two candidates had forfeited their $14,500 election deposit, namely Kenneth Jeyaretnam and Desmond Lim with 1.20% and 0.57% of the votes respectively, with the latter becoming the second candidate to have his election deposit forfeited twice since Harbans Singh, and setting a record-low vote share surpassing Teo Kim Hoe's former record of 196 votes or 0.81%, in post-independence Singapore; Lim's vote count would later be shattered in the 2015 elections by another candidate, Samir Salim Neji, with 150 votes or 0.60%.

Overseas votes were tabulated four days after the by-election, on 30 January, seeing a 0.02% change in the top two parties after Koh and Lee received 19 and 7 votes respectively (there is only one spoilt and 32 abstained votes). The results are as follows:

Aftermath
The election had seen another setback for the PAP since the formation of the 12th Parliament after the 2011 election where WP won Aljunied GRC. WP subsequently made history with Lee becoming the first female MP in post-independence to helm a SMC and the second female opposition MP to do so after WP's chair Sylvia Lim. It was also the second by-election since 1981 in which PAP lost a parliamentary seat of Anson SMC during the term to the opposition. Lee was sworn-in to parliament a week later on 4 February.

Prime Minister Lee congratulated WP for the victory and respected the voter's decision, and further cited that in a by-election, voters were seen choosing for an MP and not government, and encouraged them to vote for the opposition. He then announced that the government will now focus on current national issues in Parliament including the Population White Paper and the annual Budget statement, and mentioned that the PAP are prepared for a long term with time to deliver results, and would continue to work to improve the lives of Singaporeans, and present the report card for voters to judge in the next general election.

In the 2015 elections, PAP's Koh would be MP-elect for the Yio Chu Kang division under Ang Mo Kio GRC (and later Tampines GRC in 2020), but Lee was unable to retain the seat for a second term and returning Punggol East to the PAP-fold which was won by Joo Chiat SMC candidate Charles Chong in a narrow winning margin. Punggol East SMC would be defunct on a redistricting of boundaries in the 2020 elections under a new constituency of Sengkang GRC; WP would go on to win the GRC, eventually returning Punggol East (now renamed to Rivervale) back to the WP-fold.

References

Singapore
By-election
2013
January 2013 events in Asia